Rose Ganguzza is a New York City based producer, with over 30 years of experience in the entertainment industry. 
In 2014 she founded Rose Pictures LLC a production company specializing in independent film and long and short form television.

Production work 
She is credited as producer for the 2013 film Kill Your Darlings.

She received the title of "Godmother of NY Independent film" by the Herald de Paris.

She produces talent within New York City, because she says it “creates jobs and stimulates the economy, but it also keeps New York’s creative juices flowing”

She is working on the production of Fatima (2017), a movie revolving around the Miracle of Fatima, to be directed by Marco Pontecorvo.

Personal life 
Rose Ganguzza graduated from Immaculate Heart Academy 1966 and holds a master's degree in International Affairs from Columbia University. 
She is the mother of director and producer Antonio Campos and is married to Brazilian born TV journalist Lucas Mendes.

References

External links 
 
 Rose Ganguzza on Variety's data base.
 Company website

American film producers
Living people
Year of birth missing (living people)